Nocardioides ultimimeridianus is a Gram-positive and rod-shaped bacterium from the genus Nocardioides which has been isolated from rhizosphere soil from the plant Peucedanum japonicum from Mara Island, Korea.

References

External links
Type strain of Nocardioides ultimimeridianus at BacDive -  the Bacterial Diversity Metadatabase	

ultimimeridianus
Bacteria described in 2011